Coilin "Dook" Devlin (born 19 February 1985) is a Gaelic footballer who plays for the Derry county team, with whom he has won a National League title. He plays his club football for Ballinderry Shamrocks and has won two Derry Senior Football Championships with the club.

Playing career

Inter-county
Devlin made his Derry Senior debut in 2005. He was part of the Derry panel that won the 2008 National League where Derry beat Kerry in the final.

Club
Devlin has won Derry Championship medals with Ballinderry in 2006 and 2008.

Honours

Inter-county
National Football League:
Winner (1): 2008
Dr McKenna Cup:
Runner up: 2008
Ulster U-16 - Winner (2): years?

References

External links
Player profiles on Official Derry GAA website
Ballinderry Shamrocks GAC

1985 births
Living people
Ballinderry Gaelic footballers
Derry inter-county Gaelic footballers
Quantity surveyors